Jack de Vries (born March 28, 2002) is an American professional soccer player who plays as a midfielder for KTP, on loan from  club Venezia.

Club career
Born in Dayton, Ohio, de Vries is the son of the Dutch former professional soccer player Raimo de Vries. De Vries then moved with his family to Brussels in Belgium. While living in Belgium, de Vries was part of the youth academy at Anderlecht for three seasons before moving with his family back to the United States in Virginia Beach, Virginia.

In 2015, de Vries moved again to Philadelphia, Pennsylvania, where he joined the YSC Academy, the youth development system of Major League Soccer club Philadelphia Union. In December 2018, de Vries committed to playing college soccer for the Virginia Cavaliers at the University of Virginia. Prior to the 2019 season, de Vries joined USL Championship side Bethlehem Steel, the reserve affiliate for the Union. He joined the club on a USL academy contract, allowing him to retain his college soccer eligibility.

On March 10, 2019, de Vries made his professional debut for Bethlehem Steel in their opening match against Birmingham Legion. He came on as a late game substitute for Zach Zandi, as the Steel won 2–0.

Philadelphia Union
On August 20, 2019, de Vries agreed to join the Philadelphia Union, signing a professional pre-contract for the 2020 season. Prior to signing with the Union, de Vries also had offers to join Dutch club PSV Eindhoven and Danish side Copenhagen. Upon signing, Union sporting director Ernst Tanner praised de Vries, stating "He is an exciting attacking prospect. He is a very versatile player, capable of playing as an attacking midfielder or as a forward. He is ready for the leap to the professional game and we are pleased to have him officially join our first team next season."

On July 9, 2020, de Vries made his senior debut for the Philadelphia Union against New York City FC during the MLS is Back Tournament. He came on as a late substitute for Alejandro Bedoya. Prior to the 2021 season, in late March, de Vries was added into concussion protocol.

Venezia (loan)
On August 31, 2021, de Vries joined Serie A club Venezia on loan for the 2021–22 season, spending much of his time with the under-19 team.

On December 14, 2021, he made his first team debut for the Italian side, coming in as a substitute for Arnór Sigurðsson at the 80th minute of the Coppa Italia game against Ternana, which was eventually won 3-1 by Venezia.

Venezia
On July 7, 2022, de Vries officially returned to Venezia, joining the club on a permanent deal for a reported $1 million transfer fee. In February 2023, de Vries was loaned to Finnish side KTP along with teammate Damiano Pecile.

International career
On April 22, 2019, de Vries was selected into the United States under-17 squad for the CONCACAF U-17 Championship. He made his international debut in their opening match against Canada. He made one more appearance, as a starter against Barbados, as the United States finished as runners-up and qualified for the FIFA U-17 World Cup.

Career statistics

Honors
Philadelphia Union
 Supporters Shield: 2020

References

External links
 Profile at Philadelphia Union

2002 births
Living people
People from Dayton, Ohio
American soccer players
American people of Dutch descent
Association football midfielders
R.S.C. Anderlecht players
Philadelphia Union II players
Philadelphia Union players
Venezia F.C. players
USL Championship players
Major League Soccer players
Homegrown Players (MLS)
Soccer players from Ohio
United States men's youth international soccer players
American expatriate soccer players
Expatriate footballers in Belgium
American expatriate sportspeople in Belgium
Expatriate footballers in Italy
American expatriate sportspeople in Italy